EnduroSat AD is a Bulgarian aerospace manufacturer headquartered in Sofia. It was founded in 2015 by Raycho Raychev. 
The company designs, builds, and operates CubeSats and Nanosatellites for commercial and scientific missions and is developing inter-satellite linking and data applications. EnduroSat was nominated as one of the top 5 small satellite start-ups.

The company’s Shared Satellite Service allows multiple customer payloads to be integrated on a single NanoSat without the traditional complexity. The service streamlines space operations by covering all aspects of the process - from payload integration and launch all the way to data command and control via simplified cloud-based user interface. 

EnduroSat is a member of the International Astronautical Federation (IAF) and International Telecommunication Union (ITU).

Misisons 
 EnduroSat One: first Bulgarian CubeSat mission. The cubesat was developed within the Space Challenges 2018 program and aims at raising awareness on the topic of satellite communications and popularizing amateur radio activities. It was embarked on the cargo resupply mission Cygnus CRS-9 to the ISS launched on 21 May 2018 from Wallops Island and was deployed on 13 July 2018 via the ISS' JEM airlock.
SPARTAN: first Shared Sat mission, it consists in a 6U cubesat carrying a total of 7 payloads. It was launched on 30 June 2021 on a Falcon 9 Block 5 rocket as part of SpaceX Transporter-2 rideshare mission.
Platform 1 (SharedSat 2141): second 6U Shared Sat mission that includes an electric propulsion demonstration for Hypernova Space Technologies and the Edge computing payload from IBM. It was launched on 25 May 2022 on a Falcon 9 Block 5 rocket as part of SpaceX Transporter-5 mission.
Platform 2 (SharedSat 2211): it includes a space weather payload from Mission Space and two space propulsion demonstrations, one from Megadrive and one from Hypernova Space Technologies It was launched on 3 January 2023 on a Falcon 9 Block 5 rocket as part of SpaceX Transporter-6 mission.

References

External links
 
 Twitter Account

Spacecraft manufacturers
Manufacturing companies based in Sofia
Manufacturing companies established in 2015